William McDonald (October 7, 1837 – July 4, 1916) was a Canadian politician.

Born at the Settlement of River Deny's Road, Inverness, Nova Scotia, the son of Mary McDonald and Allan McDonald, who emigrated from South Uist, Scotland, McDonald was educated at St. Francois Xavier College, Antigonish, Nova Scotia.

A merchant, he was first elected to the House of Commons of Canada for Cape Breton in the 1872 federal election. A Conservative, he was re-elected in 1874, 1878, and 1882. In 1884, he was called to the Senate on the advice of John Alexander Macdonald representing the senatorial division of Cape Breton, Nova Scotia. He served for almost 44 years as a member of parliament and senator until his death in 1916.

The intersection of Main, Union and Commercial streets in downtown Glace Bay is named "Senator's Corner" in his honour.

Electoral record

References

External links
 

1837 births
1916 deaths
Canadian senators from Nova Scotia
Conservative Party of Canada (1867–1942) MPs
Conservative Party of Canada (1867–1942) senators
Members of the House of Commons of Canada from Nova Scotia
People from Inverness County, Nova Scotia
Canadian people of Scottish descent